Eloy Phil Casados (September 28, 1949 - April 19, 2016) was an American film, television and voice actor. He appeared in more than 20 films and 30 television series.

He was best known for playing Ishi in the 1978 NBC television movie Ishi: The Last of His Tribe and as Sheriff Sam Coyote in the CBS action television series Walker, Texas Ranger.

Filmography

Film

Television

Video games

References

External links

1949 births
2016 deaths
Male actors from Long Beach, California
American male film actors
American male television actors
American male voice actors
American male video game actors
20th-century American male actors
21st-century American male actors